Barbara Rogowska, known as Barbara Kwarc (born June 19, 1953) is a Polish comedian actress, comic and celebrity.

Life and career 
Rogowska was born in Mława, but she grew up in Wrocław. Her father (? - 2004) was a taxi driver and her mother (1929) was a cook.

In the past, Rogowska worked as a dresser at Polish Theatre in Wrocław. Later, she was a model at Academy of Fine Arts in Wrocław and an extra in many Polish films.

In 2008 she began appearing in Polish psychedelic series, Klatka B. At present, she appears in comedy series, Baśka Blog.

In 2010 she appeared in a videoclip of song Gruba Impra Z Rysiem 2 with Polish rapper Peja.

Filmography 
 2008-2009: Klatka B as Barbara Kwarc
 2010-2015: Baśka Blog as herself
 2010: One million dollars as grandmother
 2010: Ciacho as Krystyna
 2016-2017: Barbara Kwarc Official as Basia

References 

1953 births
Living people
People from Mława
Polish film actresses
Polish television actresses
Polish comedians
21st-century Polish actresses